A 99-yard pass play is the longest play involving a forward pass that is possible in an American football game. It gains 99 yards and scores a touchdown for the offensive team. The play has occurred thirteen times in NFL history, most recently by Eli Manning and Victor Cruz. The Washington Commanders are the only team to have had multiple 99 yard passes, having done so three times. They were also the first franchise to complete one, accomplishing the feat in 1939. The Chicago Bears are the only team to have given up multiple 99 yard passes, doing so three times. Teams that have had a 99 yard pass play are 10–3 in the game it occurred in.

Details
A 99-yard pass play starts with the line of scrimmage at the offensive team's one-yard line. The quarterback receives the ball, passes it from his own end zone, and completes a forward pass, which is then carried for a touchdown at the other end of the field. In addition to 99-yard pass plays, there have been two NFL 99-yard running plays, one by Derrick Henry and one by Tony Dorsett.

This play is a high-risk play, since the pass is coming from the offensive team's end zone.  If the ball is intercepted, the opposing team will likely either score a touchdown or have very good field position, and a sack can result in a safety or even a touchdown for the defense. A safety can also occur if a holding or intentional grounding penalty occurs in the end zone.

Occurrences in the NFL
Thirteen 99-yard pass plays have occurred in the history of the National Football League:

See also
List of National Football League records (individual)
NFL team records

References

External links
99-yard TDs from the Pro Football Hall of Fame (2011)

99-yard TDs from the Pro Football Hall of Fame (2011)

American football records and statistics
National Football League records and achievements
National Football League lists